Sudan Premier League is the top division of the Sudan Football Association, it was created in 1965. It starts on August 1 and ends May 31.

Sudan Premier League Clubs 2022-23

Championship history

Performance by club

Double Titles (League and Cup in the Same Season)
 Al-Merrikh SC : 6 times
 1993, 2001, 2008, 2013, 2015, 2018 
 Al-Hilal Club : 5 times
 1998, 2004, 2009, 2016, 2021-22

Top scorers

All-time top scorers

See also
African Cup of Champions Clubs / CAF Champions League
African Cup Winners' Cup / CAF Confederation Cup
CAF Cup

External links
  sudanfootball.net (arab)
 www.sudanfootball.sd (en,france,arab)

 
1
Sudan